Conasprella lenhilli, common name the brown-flamed cone, is a species of sea snail, a marine gastropod mollusk in the family Conidae, the cone snails and their allies.

Like all species within the genus Conasprella, these cone snails are predatory and venomous. They are capable of "stinging" humans, therefore live ones should be handled carefully or not at all.

Distribution
This species occurs in the Caribbean Sea off Turks & Caicos.

Description 
The maximum recorded shell length is 41.3 mm.

Habitat 
Minimum recorded depth is 440 m. Maximum recorded depth is 440 m.

References

 Puillandre N., Duda T.F., Meyer C., Olivera B.M. & Bouchet P. (2015). One, four or 100 genera? A new classification of the cone snails. Journal of Molluscan Studies. 81: 1–23

External links
 The Conus Biodiversity website
 

lenhilli
Gastropods described in 1998
Fauna of the Caribbean